The 2003 East Dorset District Council election took place on 1 May 2003 to elect members of East Dorset District Council in Dorset, England. The whole council was up for election after boundary changes and the Conservative party stayed in overall control of the council.

Election result

Ward results

References

East Dorset District Council elections
2003 English local elections
2000s in Dorset